Mine Atlı is the leader of the Communal Democracy Party, a political party of the Turkish Republic of Northern Cyprus. She is a lawyer by profession. She is also a member of the Municipal Parliament of the Turkish Part of Nicosia.

Career 
Mine Atlı is a lawyer. She is a member of the Nicosias Northern Cypriot Municipal Parliament. She was elected as the chairman of the (TDP) Communal Democracy Party in the first extraordinary congress, filling the seat of Cemal Özyiğit who had resigned. Mine Atlı is the incumbent leader of the TDP.

Atlı made a post on Facebook on May 10, 2022, which was considered slander by Ersin Tatar who pressed charges.

References 

Cypriot politicians
Cypriot women lawyers
Living people
Year of birth missing (living people)